The men's 200 metres at the 2018 Commonwealth Games, as part of the athletics programme, took place in the Carrara Stadium between 10 and 12 April 2018.

In the final, it initially appeared that England's Zharnel Hughes had edged Jereem Richards of Trinidad and Tobago at the line, recording the same time of 20.12 seconds. However, upon review Hughes was disqualified for impeding Richards (running in the next lane) using his arm. Richards was declared Commonwealth Games champion, with Canada's Aaron Brown and Leon Reid of Northern Ireland filling out the podium.

Records
Prior to this competition, the existing world and Games records were as follows:

Schedule
The schedule was as follows:

All times are Australian Eastern Standard Time (UTC+10)

Results

First round
The first round consisted of nine heats. The two fastest competitors per heat (plus six fastest losers) advanced to the semifinals.

Heat 1

Heat 2

Heat 3

Heat 4

Heat 5

Heat 6

Heat 7

Heat 8

Heat 9

Semifinals
Three semi-finals were held. The two fastest competitors per semi (plus two fastest losers) advanced to the final.

Semifinal 1

Semifinal 2

Semifinal 3

Final
The medals were determined in the final.

References

Men's 200 metres
2018